Brooklyn is a residential locality in the local government area (LGA) of Burnie in the North-west and west LGA region of Tasmania. The 2016 census recorded a population of 553 for the state suburb of Brooklyn.
It is a suburb of Burnie, to the south-east of the main town centre.

History 
Brooklyn was gazetted as a locality in 1965.

Brookville Post Office opened on 1 August 1953 and was renamed "Brooklyn" in 1968. It closed in 1973.

Geography
Alexander Creek forms much of the western boundary, and Romaine Creek most of the eastern and northern.

Road infrastructure
Route B18 (Mount Street) passes to the west. From there, Roslyn Avenue provides access to the locality from the south, while Brooklyn Road enters from the north.

Education 
Brooklyn Primary School existed until 2009. It was later merged with Upper Burnie and Acton Primary School and a new school, Romaine Park Primary was built on the grounds of the Parklands High School. The old Acton Primary School is now home to the Burnie Child and Family Centre.

References

Suburbs of Burnie, Tasmania